Monochamus talianus is a species of beetle in the family Cerambycidae. It was described by Maurice Pic in 1912.

References

talianus
Beetles described in 1912